Roofed pole or roofed pillar (plural: stogastulpiai, from stogas – 'roof' and stulpas – 'pole, pillar') is a traditional Lithuanian wooden shrine. They may have anywhere between one and three layers of stylized roofs. Roofed poles can be simple, or richly decorated. Nowadays the most common ornamentation are a distinctive blend of Christian symbolism and traditional solar, celestial, and nature motifs. Stogastulpiai, together with Lithuanian crosses, are common throughout Lithuania, and can be found in churchyards, village/town squares, cemeteries, farms, parks, in fields and woods, at cross-roads, and as wayside shrines.

See also 
Dievdirbys
Lithuanian cross crafting

References 

Architectural elements
Architecture in Lithuania
Lithuanian folk art